Raztez is a dispersed settlement in the hills northeast of Brestanica in the Municipality of Krško in eastern Slovenia. The area is part of the traditional region of Styria. It is now included in the Lower Sava Statistical Region.

References

External links
Raztez on Geopedia

Populated places in the Municipality of Krško